Bridge 5+92, Northern Central Railway is a historic railroad bridge in Seven Valleys, York County, Pennsylvania.  It was built in 1900, and measures about  overall. The girder bridge on granite abutments was built by the Northern Central Railway and crosses a roadway.

It was added to the National Register of Historic Places in 1995.

References

Railroad bridges on the National Register of Historic Places in Pennsylvania
Bridges completed in 1900
Bridges in York County, Pennsylvania
National Register of Historic Places in York County, Pennsylvania
Girder bridges in the United States
1900 establishments in Pennsylvania